Edward O'Bradovich (born May 21, 1940 in Melrose Park, Illinois) is an American former professional football player who was a defensive end in the National Football League (NFL) and Canadian Football League (CFL). He was selected by the Chicago Bears in the seventh round (91st pick) of the 1962 NFL Draft. In 2019 he was selected as one of the 100 greatest Bears of All-Time. He attended Proviso East High School in Maywood, Illinois and the University of Illinois.

O'Bradovich has the unusual distinction shared with not a small number of professional athletes who grew up, attended college, and enjoyed a long professional career in the same state. "OB", as he was known throughout his career, grew up in Hillside, IL, attended the University of Illinois and played his entire career for the Bears. Perhaps the singular professional career distinction was when he intercepted a short pass in the 1963 NFL Championship game and rumbled down the field on a key play for a Bears victory. Before joining the Bears, he played in the CFL for the B.C. Lions and the Calgary Stampeders.

He started (year) co-hosting the Suburban Tire Post Game Show after Bears games, alongside the late and great Bear Doug Buffone on WSCR in Chicago and lives in Palatine, IL. In May 2009, O'Bradovich and Buffone left WSCR-AM and joined Chicago Sports Webio. However, in June 2009, the founder of Chicago Sports Webio was charged with operating a Ponzi scheme, and the site was shut down. O'Bradovich and Buffone re-signed with the Score in late August 2009. O'Bradovich began broadcasting Chicago Rush Arena Football League games for Comcast SportsNet and WGN in 2010. Following his retirement, O'Bradovich has closely followed the Bears, giving the Pro Football Hall of Fame induction speeches for both Dan Hampton and Mike Ditka.

O'Bradovich played himself in the television movies Brian's Song, starring James Caan as Brian Piccolo, and Coach of the Year, starring Robert Conrad as former Chicago Bears player Jim Brandon.

Notes and references

1940 births
Living people
American football defensive linemen
American people of Serbian descent
Players of American football from Illinois
Chicago Bears players
Illinois Fighting Illini football players
People from Melrose Park, Illinois
BC Lions players
Calgary Stampeders players